The Battle of Black Mingo was a skirmish during the American Revolution. It took place in September 1780 in the vicinity of Dollard's Tavern at Willtown near Rhems, South Carolina. General Francis Marion attacked and scattered a contingent of Loyalist troops that had been left to secure the region by Colonel Banastre Tarleton after his destructive march through the area. The Loyalists, under Colonel John Coming Ball, were driven into Black Mingo swamp after suffering significant casualties.

Background

A company of militia was placed under the command of Brigadier General Francis Marion in the wake of the Battle of Ramsour's Mill.  Marion then engaged in a series of guerrilla actions to harry elements of the British force and its Loyalist supporters.  Following their victory at Camden the British sent out contingents to secure the countryside and capture prominent Revolutionary leaders like Marion.  These activities reduced company morale, and the hunt for Marion caused men to leave his company, until he only had about 60 left and was forced to retreat into hiding in the swamps of the border between North and South Carolina.

The British then traveled across South Carolina, plundering and destroying Revolutionary properties. This prompted Marion to move into South Carolina, where Revolutionaries angered by the British action signed up in large numbers. While the reports indicated that the Loyalist numbers were larger than his own, the enthusiasm of his men prompted him to agree to an attack.

Battle
Marion had wanted to surprise the Loyalists with an early morning attack. Alarm shots were heard in the Loyalist camp, and Marion's company rushed to engage them. Marion divided his small force into three groups sending them down the main road, and off to the right and left, surrounding the Loyalist troops which were formed up in an old field adjacent to Dollard's Tavern. The Loyalists, although greater in number, found themselves between two firing lines, gave way after just a few rounds and retreated into the swamp. Although less than 100 men were engaged in the actual fighting that lasted maybe 15 minutes, Marion lost two men, including Capt. George Logan, and 8 wounded. The Loyalists lost three and 13 wounded or captured.

Aftermath
Word of Marion's success spread, and he continued to recruit well after the battle.  He also learned a lesson: he reportedly never again crossed a bridge intending surprise without first laying blankets down on it.

See also
Henry Mouzon
Francis Marion

Notes

References

Black Mingo
Georgetown County, South Carolina
Black Mingo
Black Mingo
1780 in South Carolina